The Chishi Bridge is a bridge carrying the G76 Xiamen–Chengdu Expressway over a deep valley.  At  the longest span is  longer than France's Millau Viaduct, which has a similar structure, but is longer and higher than the Chishi Bridge.

On June 10, 2017, The New York Times offered the Chishi Bridge as an example of one of China's many troubled bridge projects.  They reported that the bridge's construction was significantly delayed, and went fifty percent over budget. The total cost of the project was US$300 million.

See also

References

Road bridges in China
Transport in Hunan
Cable-stayed bridges in China
Toll bridges in China
Bridges completed in 2016